Fredrikke Andrea Møllerup Mørck (9 November 1861 – 14 October 1934) was a Norwegian liberal feminist, editor, and teacher. She served as the editor-in-chief of the women's rights magazine Nylænde from 1916 to 1927 and as the 10th president of the Norwegian Association for Women's Rights from 1926 to 1930.

Biography
Mørck was born in Trondheim, Norway to Christian Fredrik Møllerup Mørck (1828–97) and Helene Margrethe Crøger (1829–c. 1900). She took a teacher exam in 1880 and worked as a schoolteacher, first in Tønsberg and later in Christiania. From 1900 to 1905, she taught Middle School at Rolls Pigeskole, after which she operated her independent school, Fredrikke Mørcks Pigeskole.

Mørck was a close associate of liberal feminist Gina Krog, and both shared a strong belief in gender equality. She edited the two-volume Norske Kvinder, published in 1914. She contributed to the women's rights magazine Nylænde from its start in 1887. She succeeded Krog as the magazine's second and final editor-in-chief in 1916, editing the magazine until 1927. She was president of Norway's oldest and most prominent women's and girls' rights organization, the Norwegian Association for Women's Rights, from 1926 to 1930.

References

Related reading
Lønnå, Elisabeth (1996) Stolthet og kvinnekamp : Norsk kvinnesaksforenings historie fra 1913 (Oslo: Gyldendal) 

1861 births
1934 deaths
People from Trondheim
Norwegian women's rights activists
Norwegian magazine editors
Norwegian schoolteachers
Norwegian feminists
Norwegian suffragists
Norwegian women in politics
Women magazine editors
Norwegian Association for Women's Rights people